Godagari Govt. School & College is the main school of Godagari Upazila under Rajshahi District.

History
It was established in the year 1905 with the name minor school. In the year 1948, it was upgraded to a high school and in the year 1998 it was upgraded to an intermediate college as well as school.

References

Schools in Rajshahi District
Education in Bangladesh
1905 establishments in India